Jennifer Friedman may refer to:

Jennifer Friedman (ice hockey), for Providence Friars women's ice hockey
Jennifer Friedman, character in Eight Crazy Nights

See also
Jennifer Freeman, American actress